Rasool Nagar or Rasul Nagar (Punjabi and ), is a small town in Wazirabad District, situated on the bank of the Chenab River in Punjab province of Pakistan. Having its own municipality which is govern by the chairman. The neighboring cities are Alipur Chatha at 8 km and Wazirabad at 40 km apart. It is located at 32°20'0N 73°47'0E with an altitude of 197 metres (649 feet) and is part of Wazirabad Tehsil.

Rasul Nagar is situated on Wazirabad-Pindi Bhattian highway which is being upgraded to Express Way (E-3). AA road link connects it with Alipur Chatha the nearest famous city.

History
Rasool Nagar was the site of the Battle of Ramnagar on 18 November 1848 during the Second Anglo-Sikh War.
By the 1900s Western Punjab was predominantly Muslim and supported the Muslim League and Pakistan Movement. Migration between India and Pakistan was continuous before independence. After the independence in August 1947, the minority Hindus and Sikhs migrated to India while the Muslim refugees from India settled in the Western Punjab and across Pakistan. During British rule Rasulnagar became part of Wazirabad Tehsil, the population according to the 1901 census was 7,121. Ranjit Singh the former ruler of Punjab also called the lion of Punjab have spent his time on the bank of chenab river in this area while he was the ruler of Punjab Rasool Nagar was market hub to many things at that time.

References

Wazirabad District
Populated places in Wazirabad Tehsil
Union councils of Wazirabad Tehsil